Dzhanay is a rural locality (a selo) and the administrative center of Dzhanaysky Selsoviet, Krasnoyarsky District, Astrakhan Oblast, Russia. The population was 895 as of 2010. There are 7 streets.

Geography 
Dzhanay is located 16 km northwest of Krasny Yar (the district's administrative centre) by road. Pereprava Korsaka is the nearest rural locality.

References 

Rural localities in Krasnoyarsky District, Astrakhan Oblast